The Eskimo Nebula (NGC 2392), also known as the Clown-faced Nebula, Lion Nebula, or Caldwell 39, is a bipolar double-shell planetary nebula (PN). It was discovered by astronomer William Herschel in 1787. The formation resembles a person's head surrounded by a parka hood. It is surrounded by gas that composed the outer layers of a Sun-like star. The visible inner filaments are ejected by a strong wind of particles from the central star. The outer disk contains unusual, light-year-long filaments.  

NGC 2392 lies about 6500 light-years away, and is visible with a small telescope in the constellation of Gemini.

At the center of NGC 2392, there is an O-type star with a spectral type of O(H)6f.

Historic data

The nebula was discovered by William Herschel on January 17, 1787, in Slough, England. He described it as "A star 9th magnitude with a pretty bright middle, nebulosity equally dispersed all around. A very remarkable phenomenon." NGC 2392 WH IV-45 is included in the Astronomical League's Herschel 400 observing program.

Location

NGC 2392 is located just east of δ Geminorum, just south the ecliptic.

Naming controversy
On 11 August 2020, the IAU Working Group on Star Names (WGSN), NASA/IPAC Extragalactic Database (NED), and SIMBAD Astronomical Database (CDS) discontinued use of three nicknames that were perceived as offensive - "Eskimo Nebula", "Clown Face Nebula", and "Clownface Nebula" - and strongly recommended the nebula be referred to by its NGC designation in further publications.

See also
 List of planetary nebulae
 New General Catalogue

Notes 

Radius = distance × sin(angular size / 2) = ≥2900 ly * sin(48 / 2) = ≥0.34 ly
10.1 apparent magnitude - 5 * (log10(≥880 pc distance) - 1) = ≤0.4 absolute magnitude

References

External links

 
 APOD (2003-12-07) – NGC 2392
 Eskimo Nebula Lowell Observatory
 The Structure & Evolution of the Eskimo Planetary Nebula University of Maryland Astronomy Department
 A Kinematic Determination of the Structure of the Double Ring Planetary Nebula NGC 2392, the Eskimo Astrophysical Journal v.362, p.226 October 1990
 A Cat's Eye view of the Eskimo from Saturn Maria-Teresa Garc ́ıa-D ́ıaz, Jose-Alberto L ́opez, Wofgang Steffen,Michael G. Richer and Hortensia Riesgo, 2011

Planetary nebulae
Gemini (constellation)
2392
17870117
039b